Ken Rosewall and Fred Stolle were the defending US Open men's doubles tennis champions but lost their title after a defeat in the semifinals.

Eighth-seeded Pierre Barthès and Nikola Pilić won the title by defeating sixth-seeded Roy Emerson and Rod Laver 6–3, 7–6, 4–6, 7–6 in the final.

Seeds

Draw

Finals

Top half

Section 1

Section 2

Bottom half

Section 3

Section 4

References

External links
 Association of Tennis professionals (ATP) results archive
1970 US Open – Men's draws and results at the International Tennis Federation

Men's Doubles
US Open (tennis) by year – Men's doubles